Nailstone is a village and civil parish in the Hinckley and Bosworth district of Leicestershire, England, situated to the west of Leicester and  north-east of Market Bosworth.  According to the 2001 census the parish had a population of 521, reducing slightly to 514 at the 2011 census. The village has a primary school: Dove Bank Primary School the catchment area for which also includes the neighbouring village of Bagworth. The village also has a pub: The Bull's Head

Nailstone is a former Gopsall Estate village with several buildings of special interest and unique characteristics which are particular to the Gopsall Estate villages. The village also has historical links to the Jacobite rising of 1745 when, after his retreat from Derby, Charles Edward Stuart "Bonnie Prince Charlie" visited his friends the Knowles family in Nailstone. A great elm tree was planted in the village to commemorate this event.

Nailstone has had mining links since 1862 when the first Nailstone Colliery mineshaft was sunk. The colliery was closed in 1991 and the land was purchased to provide a logistics centre and country park

Nailstone became a conservation village in 2015.

References

External links

Civil parishes in Leicestershire
Villages in Leicestershire
Hinckley and Bosworth